La Palma is a municipality and town in the department of Cundinamarca, Colombia.

References

Municipalities of Cundinamarca Department